Avaya Virtual Services Platform 9000 Series or VSP 9000 is a set of modular chassis switches used in enterprise and data center networks, manufactured by Avaya.  The VSP 9000 is used by institutions which are suffering from performance limitations, need to simplify their network infrastructure in a virtualized environment, or require 10 Gigabit Ethernet today with the option to scale to 40 or 100 Gigabit Ethernet in the future. It is also an option for companies who are looking to reduce the power and cooling cost in order to maximize the cost-effectiveness of their infrastructures; this unit was also designed and is expected to have a lifespan of seven-to-ten years.
In 2013 the Olympics network backbone is built with VSP 9000 Switches supporting 30,000 users and up to 54 terabits per second of traffic.

General Specifications
The VSP 9000 Series consists of two Chassis models; the original 9012 Chassis supports twelve (12) horizontally-orientated front-panel slots, ten (10) of which are designated for I/O Modules and two reserved for CPU Modules, and the newer 9010 Chassis that support ten (10) vertically orientated slots, eight (8) for I/O Modules, again with two reserved for CPU Modules.  The primary driver for the 9010 Chassis is where there is an exclusive requirement for front-to-back cooling.

The VSP 9000 supports up to 240 10 Gigabit Ethernet ports and is future-ready to support 40 Gigabit Ethernet and 100 Gigabit Ethernet ports which speed over a 100 terabit per second 
Switch Cluster. The chassis also supports Shortest Path Bridging, Provider link state bridging, and Split multi-link trunking at up to 480 trunks with 16 links per trunk group.  This product can also maintain over 4000 VLANs and IP interfaces with support for up to ten thousand static IP routes over an IP forwarding table with 500 thousand entires. Some more technological performance measures are as follows: 
VRRP Interfaces: up to 512
Circuitless IP Instances: up to 256
ECMP Routes: up to 64k
RIP Instances: up to 64
RIP Routes: up to 10k
OSPF Instances: up to 64
OSPF Areas: up to 80
OSPF Adjacencies: up to 512
OSPF Routes: up to 64k
BGP Peers: up to 256
BGP Routes: up to 1,500k
VRF instances: up to 512

Rack scalability
 720  ×  10 Gigabit Ethernet ports
 1440 × 1 Gigabit Ethernet ports

See also

 Avaya
 Avaya Networking Products
 Avaya Government Solutions
 Avaya Professional Credentials
 Shortest Path Bridging
 Terabit Ethernet
Split multi-link trunking

References

Further reading 
 
 
 
 
 Chad Berndtson (9 June 2011) Westcon Sees Inroads With Avaya Data Networking CRN

External links

 Virtual services platform 9000 overview

Avaya
VSP-9000
Network architecture